Helminthosphaeria is a genus of fungi in the family Helminthosphaeriaceae (Ascomycota).

Species
H. carpathica
H. clavariarum
H. corticiorum
H. hercynica
H. hyphodermae
H. mammillata
H. odontiae
H. palustris
H. pilifera
H. sanguinolenta

References

Sordariomycetes genera
Sordariales
Taxa named by Karl Wilhelm Gottlieb Leopold Fuckel